The Kolikyogan (also Колекъёган, often written Kolik"yegan or Kolik'egan) is a river in the Khanty-Mansi Autonomous Okrug of Russia. It is a right-hand tributary of the westward-flowing Vakh, which it enters from the north.

The interfluvial area between the Kolikyogan and Sabun rivers of the west Siberian lowland is a zone of raised string bogs covering .
It is a status B Ramsar wetland, nominated for designation as a Wetland of International Importance in 2000.
The river gives its name to the Verkhae-Kolikyogan oilfield, which has estimated ultimate recovery of  oil and of  gas.

References

Citations

Sources

Rivers of Khanty-Mansi Autonomous Okrug